Zamora Memorial College (abbreviation: ZMC) is a private school in Bacacay, Albay, Philippines, that offers secondary and tertiary education. Founded in 1948 by Crispin Bermas Vergara, Sr., its name commemorates Friar Juan Zamora of Tayabas, Quezon, the founder of the first collegiate school in Albay.

History

Zamora Memorial College was founded as Zamora Memorial Institute on October 24, 1948 by Crispin Bermas Vergara, a retired supervisor of the Division of Albay. This was in response to the growing need for secondary education of Bacacayanos. At that time, only the upper middle class Bacacayanos have access to secondary education because high schools were only available in  Legazpi or Tabaco.

The first campus of the institute was a rented building located in the corner of Bes and Barrameda Streets in Bacacay. A typhoon struck and the building was destroyed.

Several parents and benefactors helped in reconstructing the school. For its new site, Mr. Vergara purchased a 3.7 acre parcel of land from Doña Beatrice Alparce which to this day is the present site of the school. The first school building constructed was made of bamboo and nipa. Through the years, this building was replaced by concrete building to withstand typhoons which  frequently visit the town. Additional concrete buildings were subsequently constructed to accommodate the growing number of enrollment.

In 1996, with the growing clamor for access to tertiary education in Bacacay, the Board of Trustees responded with the opening of the college department. At the time of its opening, it was fully recognized by the Commission on Higher Education. It started with two students and part-time faculty with classes in the evening. Through the years, the number of enrollment increase to approximately 500 students. With a substantial number of graduating students, in 2013, the College Department conducted a separate Commencement Exercises from High School Department.

In 1998, ZMC celebrated its 50th Founding Anniversary and renewed its commitment to continue educating generations of Bacacayanos.

Starting School Year 2011 - 2012, the school transitioned to K-12 curriculum pursuant to the Department of Education directive. Consequently, the Senior High School was commenced during School Year 2016-2017.

School Identity and Culture

Motto
The school motto - "Bringing Possibilities" - aptly depicts what the founder intended to accomplish by educating students to open up possibilities for them.

Vision
Zamora Memorial College (ZMC) envisions to be a dynamic institution producing graduates with desirable values and who will be empowered agents of humane change.

Mission
Zamora Memorial College shall provide quality and relevant education for life-long learning and shall produce globally-competitive basic education graduates as well as professionals who are socially sensitive and pro-active.

ZMC Hymn
The Zamora Memorial College Hymn was composed by Dr. Victor M. Belgica and the lyrics was provided by Dr. Ricardo M. Belgica. Both of them are professors at Bicol University and alumni of Zamora Memorial College.

Zamora Memorial College Hymn

This is a school of a humble birth

Yet was conceived from a grandiose dream

Reared on a lofty aspiration

And was nurtured with the sacred end.

Within her bosom lies a fountain

That bathe our soul with enlightenment

Showers our hearts with lights of hope

And quenches our spirit thirst for truth.

Zamora Memorial College

Thy name will always remember

The precious moment that we have shared

In our heart will remain forever.

Curriculum

College Department 
The College Department offers the following degree courses:

Bachelor of Elementary Education
The Bachelor of Elementary Education (BEED) is a four-year degree program designed to prepare students to become primary school teachers. The program combines both theory and practice in order to teach students the necessary knowledge and skills a primary school teacher needs.

Bachelor of Secondary Education
The Bachelor of Secondary Education (BSEd) is a four-year degree program designed to prepare students for becoming high school teachers. The program combines both theory and practice in order to teach students the necessary knowledge and skills a high school teacher needs. The BSEd program trains students to teach one of the different learning areas such as English, Mathematics, General Science, Filipino, Social Studies, Biological Sciences, Physics, Chemistry, Music, Arts, Physical Education and Health (MAPEH) and Home Economics and Livelihood Education.

Certificate for Professional Teaching
The Certificate for Professional Teaching (CPT) program is for individuals who have finished any four-year non-education degree course who want to pursue master's degree in Education and want to teach or who aim to have personal professional development and continuing education.

High School Departments
Both the Junior and Senior High School Departments offer K-12 Curriculum.

Scholarship Grants

Various scholarship grants are available for both college and high school students. These grants are listed below.

College Department

1. CHED-STUFAPS

2. Student Assistantships

3. CSCDI Scholarships

4. CFCA Scholarships

Senior High School Department

1. Department of Education Voucher

Junior High School Department

1. DepEd-FAPE Educational Service Contracting Program (GATSPE Law)

2. Edgardo V. Lawenko Scholarship

3. Scholarships for the Best and Brightest Students

4. CSCDI Scholarship

5. CFCA Scholarship

Campus
The ZMC campus is nestled on a 3.7 acre of land located at the town center of Bacacay, Albay.

Facilities include:
 The Crispin B. Vergara Hall, which houses the administration office, Senior High School Department, library, and science and TESDA laboratories. 
 The Cora T. Vergara Hall, which houses the College Department
 The Arsenio B. Vergara Gymnasium
 Design Technology Workshops 
 Guidance Office
 Outdoor Stage
 Basketball Court
 Botanical Garden

See also
 Education in the Philippines
 Commission on Higher Education (Philippines)
 Department of Education (Philippines)
 Fund for Assistance to Private Education
 Technical Education and Skills Development Authority

External links 
 Zamora Memorial College's website

References

Universities and colleges in Albay